Dr. Evelyn  Mansa  Amarteifio (1916-1997) was a Ghanaian women's organiser. In 1953 she established the National Federation of Gold Coast Women (NFGCW).

Early Life and Education

Evelyn  Amarteifio was born  on  May  22,  1916  in  Accra. Her parents, two of her sisters, and some of her aunts were involved  in  social  and  voluntary  work  in  the  1920s  and  1930s. She studied at Accra Girls School and Achimota College. In 1937 she became a teacher at the Achimota Primary School, and continued to pursue voluntary work.

In early 1953 Amarteifio travelled to Britain to study with the YWCA. On her return – together with Annie Jiagge, Thyra Casely-Hayford, Amanua Korsah and others – she established a YWCA in the Gold Coast. She also travelled to the United States, where she learned about the Jamaican Federation of Women. She used this as a model for the National Federation of Gold Coast Women, a non-governmental national women's organization. After independence Amarteifio could not protect the federation from Kwame Nkrumah's desire to control women's organizations, and in 1960 the NFGCW was dissolved.

Death 
Amarteifio died on July 6, 1997.

References

1916 births
1997 deaths
Alumni of Achimota School
Ghanaian women's rights activists
Ghanaian women activists
20th-century Ghanaian women
People from Accra